Oxybelus bipunctatus is a species of square-headed wasp in the family Crabronidae. It is found in Africa, Europe and Northern Asia (excluding China), and North America.

Subspecies
These two subspecies belong to the species Oxybelus bipunctatus:
 Oxybelus bipunctatus bipunctatus Olivier, 1812
 Oxybelus bipunctatus thermophilus de Beaumont, 1950

References

Crabronidae
Articles created by Qbugbot
Insects described in 1812